
Parina Quta (Aymara parina flamingo, quta lake, "flamingo lake", hispanicized spellings Parinacota, Parina Kkota) is a lake in Bolivia in the Oruro Department, Carangas Province, Corque Municipality. It is situated west of  Poopó Lake, about 3,753 m (12,313 ft) high. Parina Quta is about 1.9 km long and 0.5 km at its widest point.

See also 
 Jayu Quta
 Kimsa Chata

References 

Lakes of Oruro Department